The 2022 season was the Los Angeles Rams' 85th in the National Football League (NFL), their 86th overall, their 56th in the Greater Los Angeles Area, the third playing their home games at SoFi Stadium, their sixth under head coach Sean McVay, and eleventh under general manager Les Snead. 

The Rams came into the 2022 season as the defending Super Bowl champions for the first time since 2000, when the club was based in St. Louis. They attempted to become the first team to repeat as Super Bowl champions since the 2004 New England Patriots. However, after a 2–1 start, the Rams struggled and achieved the unwanted distinction of being one of the worst defending title holders in the history of North American sports.

The Rams failed to match their 12–5 record from the previous year after a Week 10 loss to the Arizona Cardinals. After their Week 13 loss to the Seattle Seahawks, the Rams secured their first losing season since 2016 (and thus their first losing season in the Sean McVay era). Following their Week 15 loss to the Green Bay Packers, they were eliminated from playoff contention. A Week 17 loss to the crosstown Los Angeles Chargers marked the Rams 11th loss, eclipsing the 1999 Denver Broncos for most losses by a defending Super Bowl champion. Following an overtime loss to the Seattle Seahawks in their final game of the season, they failed to match the .333 winning percentage the 3–6 San Francisco 49ers recorded in the strike-shortened 1982 season. The Rams' .294 percentage is the worst-ever record by any defending NFL or AFL champion. They were the first defending Super Bowl champion to finish with a losing record since the 2003 Tampa Bay Buccaneers, and the first defending Super Bowl champion to miss the playoffs since the 2016 Denver Broncos. To add to all those struggles, the Rams went 1–7 on the road for the first time since 2011, when the team was still based in St. Louis. 

The Rams had dealt with notable key injuries to most of their starters including quarterback Matthew Stafford and All-Pros Cooper Kupp and Aaron Donald, all of whom had played prominent roles in the team's Super Bowl run of the previous season. The Rams finished the season with the third most players on injured reserve behind the Tennessee Titans and Denver Broncos. Through each of their first eleven games of the season alone, the Rams have started 11 different offensive line combinations. No team since the 1970 AFL–NFL merger has accomplished this feat.

Offseason

Coaching changes
The Minnesota Vikings hired Rams offensive coordinator Kevin O'Connell as their new head coach February 16, 2022. The following day, Chris O'Hara, an offensive assistant with the Rams in 2021, was hired to join O'Connell's staff as quarterbacks coach. On February 21, 2022, Wes Phillips was hired by the Vikings as offensive coordinator. Phillips had served as tight ends coach for McVay in two stints over five seasons with Washington (2014–2016) and Los Angeles (2019–2021), and in 2021 had added the title of pass game coordinator.
The Denver Broncos named Rams secondary coach/passing game coordinator Ejiro Evero as defensive coordinator for new head coach Nathaniel Hackett's staff. Also hired from the Rams were assistant special teams coach Dwayne Stukes as special teams coordinator and assistant defensive line coach Marcus Dixon as defensive line coach on February 17, 2022.
Liam Coen was hired as offensive coordinator, succeeding Kevin O'Connell. Coen had served as an assistant wide receivers and quarterbacks coach with the Rams from 2018 to 2020 before leaving to serve as offensive coordinator at the University of Kentucky.
Thomas Brown, the Rams' running backs coach for the previous two seasons, was reassigned to take over for Phillips as tight ends coach, while retaining his position as assistant head coach.
Fourth-year staffer Zac Robinson was given the dual titles of pass game coordinator/quarterbacks coach after spending the previous season as assistant quarterbacks coach.
Lance Schulters, a former safety who played 10 years in the NFL primarily with the San Francisco 49ers and Tennessee Titans, was promoted to defensive assistant after spending 2021 on the Rams staff as a coaching fellow.
Having coached linebackers over the previous five seasons with the Rams, Chris Shula was named pass game coordinator/defensive backs coach.
Other internal promotions included Thad Bogardus being elevated to outside linebackers coach after spending 2021 as assistant linebackers coach, while Jonathan Cooley became defensive backs coach after serving as assistant secondary coach the previous season.
Ra'Shaad Samples was hired to succeed Thomas Brown as Rams running backs coach after having held the same position at SMU.
Greg Olson, who had served as Rams quarterbacks coach during Sean McVay's first season in 2017, returned to the club as a senior offensive assistant after spending the four previous seasons as offensive coordinator with the Oakland/Las Vegas Raiders. Olson had also been offensive coordinator for the then-St. Louis Rams in 2006 and 2007.
During preseason, Sean McVay announced that Jay Gruden, who had been head coach of the Washington Redskins during McVay's tenure there, had been hired as an offensive consultant and would work remotely for the team.

Draft

Draft trades

Staff

Final roster

Preseason
The Rams' preseason opponents were announced May 12, 2022 along with the release of the NFL's regular season schedule, with exact dates and times announced eleven days later.

Regular season

Schedule
As the defending Super Bowl champions, the Rams earned the right to host the NFL Kickoff Game against the Buffalo Bills at SoFi Stadium. This was also the first season in which the NFC teams played nine regular season home games as per the new seventeen game schedule. By also playing an away game against the Chargers, in addition to not being the designated home team for any neutral site games, the 2022 Rams became the first team to play ten regular season games in their home stadium. 

On May 10, the NFL announced that the Rams would host the Denver Broncos as part of a Christmas Day triple-header on December 25. The game kicked off at 1:30 p.m. PST, and was televised by CBS and Nickelodeon.

The remainder of the Rams' 2022 schedule was announced on May 12.

Note: Intra-division opponents are in bold text.

Game summaries

Week 1: vs. Buffalo Bills
NFL Kickoff Game

Starting the 2022 campaign at home on Thursday Night Football, the Rams were shut out in the second half as Sean McVay lost a season opener for the first time as head coach. After falling behind 10–0 in the second quarter, Los Angeles rallied back on a 4-yard touchdown pass from quarterback Matthew Stafford to wide receiver Cooper Kupp, while kicker Matt Gay converted a 57-yard field goal at the end of the second quarter. Stafford, who surpassed 50,000 career passing yards, completed 29 of 41 passes for 240 yards but threw three interceptions and was sacked seven times. Kupp, the NFL's leading receiver in 2021, caught 13 passes for 128 yards and a score to lead the Rams offense. Defensively, cornerback Jalen Ramsey led Los Angeles with six tackles but was victimized on a 53-yard touchdown pass from Bills quarterback Josh Allen to wide receiver Stefon Diggs in the fourth quarter, while linebacker Bobby Wagner had five tackles with two assists and a sack in his debut with the Rams.

Week 2: vs. Atlanta Falcons

The Rams built a commanding 28–3 lead in the third quarter, then had to withstand a fourth quarter rally by Atlanta to gain their first victory of the season. Quarterback Matthew Stafford connected with wide receiver Allen Robinson for a 1-yard touchdown late in the first quarter, then threw two more TD passes to wide receiver Cooper Kupp in the second (3 yards) and third quarters (10 yards). Running back Darrell Henderson led the team with 47 rushing yards on 10 attempts and scored on an 8-yard run in the second period. Rookie cornerback Cobie Durant returned an interception 51 yards late in the second quarter to set up a Rams touchdown and added two tackles including a sack of Falcons quarterback Marcus Mariota. However, Mariota bounced back to throw two touchdown passes while Atlanta also scored after blocking Rams punter Riley Dixon to close to within 31–25. But Rams cornerback Jalen Ramsey came up with a critical interception at the goal line with just over a minute remaining and the Rams were able to escape. Kapp had 11 receptions for 108 yards and two scores while Stafford passed for 272 yards and three TDs along with two interceptions. On defense, linebacker Ernest Jones had a team-high 12 tackles while fellow linebacker Bobby Wagner added seven tackles and a sack in the win for Los Angeles.

Week 3: at Arizona Cardinals

With a strong defensive performance that kept the Cardinals offense out of the end zone for the entire game, the Rams picked up their first NFC West victory of the season. The win was the Rams' eighth straight over Arizona at State Farm Stadium, a streak that started in 2015. Kicker Matt Gay converted field goals of 22 and 40 yards while wide receiver ran 20 yards on a jet sweep in the second quarter to score the first rushing touchdown of his NFL career as Los Angeles built a 13–0 lead. Running back Cam Akers rushed for a game-high 61 yards on 12 carries, including a 14-yard touchdown run to give the Rams a 20–9 advantage late in the third quarter. However, Akers was stripped of the ball at the goal line as Los Angeles was poised to go up by three scores midway through fourth quarter. Rookie cornerback Derion Kendrick and veteran linebacker Bobby Wagner shared the team lead in tackles with nine as they helped to limit the Cardinals to just four field goals by kicker Matt Prater. Defensive tackle Aaron Donald added six total tackles, including a sack of Arizona quarterback Kyler Murray for minus-15 yards in the first quarter that was the 100th sack of the perennial All-Pro's NFL career. Rams quarterback Matthew Stafford threw for 249 yards but did not throw a touchdown pass in a game for the first time since coming to Los Angeles.

Week 4: at San Francisco 49ers

The host 49ers racked up seven sacks and dominated the line of scrimmage on both sides of the ball to continue their mastery of the Rams in the regular season with their seventh straight victory. Meeting for the first time since the 2021 NFC Championship Game, the 49ers gave up an early field goal to Rams kicker Matt Gay but then seized the lead on a 32-yard touchdown run by running back Jeff Wilson and extended their advantage to 14–6 when San Francisco quarterback Jimmy Garoppolo connected with wide receiver Deebo Samuel on a 57-yard catch-and-run late in the second quarter. Rams quarterback Matthew Stafford completed 32 of 48 passes for 254 yards but was sacked seven times and was constantly harassed by 49ers defensive end Nick Bosa and linebacker Samson Ebukam (a former Ram), both of whom had two sacks each. Stafford also threw a fourth quarter interception that was returned by San Francisco strong safety Talanoa Hufanga 52 yards for a touchdown and the game's final points. Wide receiver Cooper Kupp totaled a career-high 14 receptions (for 122 yards) but was held out of the end zone. Linebacker Bobby Wagner led the Rams with 10 tackles and was notable for tackling a protestor who ran onto the field late in the second quarter.

Week 5: vs. Dallas Cowboys

A fumble and a blocked punt on the game's first two possessions put the Rams into a hole that they could not recover from in their second straight defeat. Quarterback Matthew Stafford was sacked on the game's third play by Cowboys defensive end Dorance Armstrong, who stripped Stafford of the ball which was then scooped up by defensive end DeMarcus Lawrence and returned 19 yards for a touchdown. On the Rams' next possession, Armstrong came up with a second big play, blocking a punt by Riley Dixon and returning it 14 yards down the L.A. 20 which led to a field goal by Brett Maher and a 9–0 lead. The Rams answered with a 29-yard field goal by kicker Matt Gay that was set up by a 54-yard deep pass from Stafford to wide receiver Tutu Atwell. In the second quarter, Los Angeles took a 10–9 lead as wide receiver Cooper Kupp took a Stafford pass and outran Dallas cornerback Trevon Diggs for a 75-yard touchdown, the longest reception of Kupp's career. But the Cowboys responded on their next drive as running back Tony Pollard scored on a 57-yard touchdown to retake the lead which Dallas would never relinquish. Maher added field goals in the third and fourth quarters as the Cowboys extended their advantage. Stafford passed for 308 yards and was sacked five times (Dallas outside linebacker Micah Parsons had two) while the Rams running game sputtered with only 38 yards on 15 attempts. On defense for the Rams, defensive tackle Aaron Donald had six total tackles including two sacks in the loss.

Week 6: vs. Carolina Panthers

The Rams defense held the visiting Panthers out of the end zone while the offense finally got untracked as Los Angeles evened its record to 3–3 going into the bye week. Linebackers Ernest Jones and Bobby Wagner shared the team lead with seven tackles each while leading a defensive effort that limited Carolina to just 203 total yards. Cornerback Jalen Ramsey had three solo tackles including a sack and free safety Nick Scott added an interception to snuff out the Panthers' final offensive drive. For the Rams, wide receiver Allen Robinson scored on a 5-yard touchdown pass from quarterback Matthew Stafford late in the second quarter and finished with five receptions for 63 yards. Fellow wide receiver Ben Skowronek also had five receptions (for 40 yards) and scored the first touchdown of his NFL career on a 17-yard run in the third quarter. Getting his first start of the season, running back Darrell Henderson had 12 carries for 43 yards including a 2-yard touchdown run midway through the fourth quarter. Stafford completed 26 of 33 passes for 253 yards and a touchdown, but threw a costly interception that was returned for a touchdown to give Carolina a 10–7 halftime lead.

Week 8: vs. San Francisco 49ers

In a rematch of the 2021 NFC Championship Game, the visiting 49ers continued their regular season dominance of the Rams by scoring 21 unanswered points in the second half. Making his first start for San Francisco 10 days after a midseason trade with Carolina, running back Christian McCaffrey turned in a spectacular performance, rushing for a game-high 94 yards on 18 carries with a 1-yard touchdown run, catching a team-high 8 passes for 55 yards including a 9-yard touchdown reception, while throwing a 34-yard touchdown pass to Brandon Aiyuk. McCaffrey, who played his last game for the Panthers two weeks earlier against the Rams on the same field, joined Walter Payton and LaDainian Tomlinson as the only players to run, catch, and throw for touchdowns in the same game. Los Angeles took a 14–10 halftime lead as quarterback Matthew Stafford ran for a 1-yard touchdown in the first quarter and threw a 16-yard touchdown pass to wide receiver Cooper Kupp in the second, but the Rams  were held to just 58 yards after halftime. Kupp had seven receptions in the first half but was held to only one catch after the intermission. Linebacker Leonard Floyd had a team-high nine tackles including two sacks. 49ers quarterback Jimmy Garoppolo completed 21 of 25 passes for 235 yards and two touchdowns and improved to 8–1 lifetime against the Rams as San Francisco won its eighth straight regular season game over Los Angeles.

Week 9: at Tampa Bay Buccaneers

In a rematch of the 2021 NFC Divisional game, the Rams lost a heartbreaking game in Tampa Bay to fall to 3–5 on the season. The Buccaneers made it to the red zone on their opening drive, but the Rams' defense held and forced a field goal, which put the Buccaneers in front 3–0. In the second quarter, the Rams took a 7–3 lead when Stafford connected with Kupp on a 69-yard touchdown pass. From there, the teams exchanged punts and field goals until the final minute of the game. On Tampa Bay's penultimate drive, with the Rams ahead 13–9, receiver Scotty Miller dropped a touchdown pass from quarterback Tom Brady that would have given the Buccaneers the lead. On the ensuing two plays, Ramsey deflected two passes from Brady, causing the Buccaneers to turn the ball over on downs. The Rams had a chance to run out the clock on the ensuing possession, but failed to do so. After a punt with about 1 minute remaining in the game, Brady dissected the Rams' soft zone defense on the Buccaneers' final drive and put his team ahead with a 1-yard touchdown pass to rookie tight end Cade Otton. With minimal time left to score, the Rams failed to answer, and the Buccaneers won 16–13.

Week 10: vs. Arizona Cardinals

With their playoff hopes fading after two consecutive losses, the Rams returned home for a game against the Arizona Cardinals, who the Rams defeated earlier in the season. With backup quarterback John Wolford starting in place of Matthew Stafford, who was unable to play due to concussion protocols, the Rams' offense continued to struggle as it had all season. After the Rams' Matt Gay kicked a field goal on their opening drive, the Cardinals scored 17 unanswered points, including two touchdowns inside of the final two minutes of the first half. With 1:56 remaining in the second quarter, Arizona running back James Conner scored a touchdown to put the Cardinals ahead 10–3. On the ensuing Rams' drive, a strip sack of Wolford by Arizona linebacker Myjai Sanders gave the Cardinals prime field position, and they cashed in when Arizona backup quarterback Colt McCoy connected with wide receiver A. J. Green on a 6-yard touchdown pass with 24 seconds remaining in the half. In the third quarter, a 4-yard touchdown run by Darrell Henderson pulled the Rams to within one score of the Cardinals. However, in the final quarter, Arizona wide receiver Rondale Moore made an amazing one-handed catch of a McCoy pass on 4th-and-3 for 26 yards, leading to a 9-yard touchdown run by Conner that brought Arizona's lead back to 14 points. A field goal later in the quarter increased Arizona's advantage to 17 points, and the game ended 27–17 after the Rams scored with seven seconds remaining on a TD pass from Wolford to wide receiver Van Jefferson. With the loss, the Rams fell to 3–6 on the season. Kupp also suffered an ankle sprain during the game and was ruled out for the upcoming game at the New Orleans Saints.

Week 11: at New Orleans Saints

For the first time in his coaching career, Sean McVay lost four straight games as Los Angeles dropped its record to 3–7 in their first visit to the Superdome since the 2018 NFC Championship Game. Returning to the starting lineup, quarterback Matthew Stafford threw two touchdowns in the first half, but was pulled out of the game midway through the third quarter after taking several hard hits. Without him, the Rams offense was held to two field goals in yet another lackluster second half effort. Saints quarterback Andy Dalton threw two touchdown passes in the third quarter to turn a 14–10 deficit into a 24–14 lead for New Orleans. Playing his first significant action of the season, Rams backup quarterback Bryce Perkins completed 5 of 10 passes for 64 yards and ran five times for 39 yards but was sacked three times in the loss. Wide receiver Allen Robinson caught four passes for 47 yards and a touchdown and running back Cam Akers ran 14 times for 61 yards for Los Angeles on offense, while defensive linebacker Leonard Floyd and defensive tackle Greg Gaines had two sacks each, but the Rams defense failed to generate a turnover for the fourth straight game.

Week 12: at Kansas City Chiefs

With Matthew Stafford sidelined again due to concussion protocols and down their top two receivers, the injury-riddled Rams fell on the road to the AFC-leading Chiefs. Kansas City drove 90 yards on nine plays midway through the first period to score the game's first points as star quarterback Patrick Mahomes connected with tight end Travis Kelce on a 39-yard touchdown pass. From that point, the Rams' defense made several red zone stands against one of the best red zone offenses in football, to keep the game close. Free safety Nick Scott killed a Kansas City drive with an interception near the goal line in the fourth quarter, L.A.'s first defensive turnover in five games. Fellow safety Taylor Rapp led the Rams with 12 tackles, while defensive tackle Aaron Donald had three tackles before leaving the game with a sprained ankle. The Rams' offense, led by third-string quarterback Bryce Perkins making his first career regular season start, struggled to gain traction and only mustered ten points with Perkins throwing a 12-yard touchdown pass to wide receiver Van Jefferson to start the fourth period as the Rams' losing streak reached five straight games.

Week 13: vs. Seattle Seahawks

The Rams rallied to take a fourth quarter lead but could not hold on as Geno Smith's 8-yard touchdown pass to DK Metcalf with 36 seconds remaining gave Seattle its first win at Los Angeles since 2017. Smith passed for 367 yards and three touchdowns as the Rams fell to 3–9, ensuring themselves of the team's first losing season since 2016 and first losing season ever for head coach Sean McVay. Running back Cam Akers' 1-yard touchdown run capped off an impressive 10-play, 77-yard opening drive for Los Angeles and kicker Matt Gay added a 40-yard field goal. Gay added two more field goals of 54 and 32 yards to keep the Rams close and Akers (17 carries, 60 yards) scored his second touchdown of the day on a 6-yard run with 2:56 remaining before Seattle made its final comeback. John Wolford got his second start at quarterback throwing 178 yards with two interceptions. Cornerback Derion Kendrick led the Rams with 10 tackles while middle linebacker Bobby Wagner recorded seven total tackles with two sacks and an interception in playing his first game against the Seahawks, with whom Wagner had played for the first 10 seasons of his career.

Week 14: vs. Las Vegas Raiders

Trailing by 13 points with under four minutes remaining, the Rams rallied for an improbable victory and ended their six-game losing streak during a Thursday Night Football game at SoFi Stadium. Acquired off waivers from Carolina just two days earlier, quarterback Baker Mayfield supplanted starter John Wolford after the first series and led the Rams to a 55-yard field goal by Matt Gay. But the Rams offense struggled through the second and third quarters as the Raiders tried to build their lead after scoring a touchdown on their opening possession. L.A.'s defense turned in a strong performance after giving up the early touchdown, limiting the Raiders to three field goals the rest of the way. Middle linebacker Bobby Wagner led the Rams with 14 total tackles while fellow linebacker Ernest Jones's interception in the end zone late in the second quarter snuffed out another Las Vegas threat. The Raiders were up 16–3 in the fourth quarter after kicking a field goal with 12:20 to go, but L.A. went on a 17-play, 75-yard drive that consumed nine minutes, culminating with a Cam Akers 1-yard touchdown run with 3:19 remaining to narrow the score to 16–10. After the defense forced a three-and-out on the next Raiders' possession, the Rams got the ball at their own 2-yard line with 1:45 remaining and proceeded to drive 98 yards in eight plays, with Mayfield throwing a game-tying 23-yard touchdown pass to Van Jefferson with nine seconds remaining. The Rams took their first lead of the night, 17–16, with Gay's successful extra point, and a Taylor Rapp interception on the first play after the ensuing kickoff sealed the game. Mayfield was named NFC Offensive Player of the Week after completing 22 of 35 passes for 230 yards and a TD. The Rams' 98-yard go-ahead drive was reported to be the longest drive of its kind in the final two minutes of a game over the previous 45 NFL seasons.

Week 15: at Green Bay Packers

Despite playing in chilly conditions at Lambeau Field, the visiting Rams played close in the first half but ultimately fell to the host Packers on Monday Night Football. Making his first start at quarterback for the Rams, Baker Mayfield completed only 12 of 21 passes for 111 yards with a touchdown and an interception. Kicker Matt Gay's field goals of 33 and 55 yards in the second quarter accounted for all of the Rams' first half points. But Green Bay pulled away as running back A. J. Dillon scored two touchdowns and running back Aaron Jones scored on a 7-yard pass from quarterback Aaron Rodgers to put the Packers up 24–6. The Rams answered with Mayfield throwing an 8-yard TD pass to tight end Tyler Higbee late in the third period to end the game's scoring. L.A. running back Cam Akers had 100 yards in total offense (12 rushes, 65 yards; 3 receptions, 35 yards) to lead the Rams offense. On defense, Taylor Rapp had his second interception in as many weeks and linebacker Leonard Floyd had two sacks in the game, which dropped the Rams' record to 4–10.

Week 16: vs. Denver Broncos
Christmas Day games

Playing their first-ever game on Christmas Day, the Rams put together their best performance of the season, scoring on eight consecutive possessions in a rout of the Broncos in L.A.'s final regular season home game. Despite playing with their 13th different offensive line combination in 15 games, the Rams' offense displayed considerable strength against the Broncos' defense, which was rated No. 3 in the NFL up to that point, rolling up 388 total yards. Running back Cam Akers had his best individual game of the season, rushing the ball 23 times for 118 yards and scoring a career-high three touchdowns. Quarterback Baker Mayfield completed 24 of 28 passes for 230 yards and two touchdowns, both of which went to tight end Tyler Higbee (9 receptions, 94 yards), whose 9-yard TD reception in the first quarter made him the Rams' all-time leader in touchdown receptions by a tight end in team history. Kicker Matt Gay added field goals of 30, 53, and 55 yards for Los Angeles. Meanwhile, the Rams’ defense recorded six sacks (two by newly acquired defensive end Larrell Murchison) and four interceptions. Rookie cornerback Cobie Durant had two interceptions, the second of which he returned 85 yards for the game's final touchdown. With the win, the Rams improved to 5–10, winning their fifth straight game against Denver dating back to 2006, when the team was based in St. Louis.

Week 17: at Los Angeles Chargers

A lackluster second half doomed the Rams in their first regular season matchup against their fellow tenants at SoFi Stadium. Kicker Matt Gay's 23-yard field goal near the end of the first quarter gave the Rams their only lead of the game. The Chargers pulled ahead as running back Austin Ekeler ran for touchdowns of 10 and 72 yards in the second quarter to help build a 17–10 halftime lead. Ekeler (10 carries, 122 yards) became the first running back to surpass 100 rushing yards against the Rams defense during the 2022 regular season. Chargers quarterback Justin Herbert completed 21 of 28 passes for 212 yards and threw two touchdowns in the second half, one to former Rams tight end Gerald Everett in the third quarter. The Rams were led by running back Cam Akers, who had 19 carries for 123 yards while fellow running back Malcolm Brown had a 23-yard run in the second quarter for the Rams' only touchdown. Quarterback Baker Mayfield completed 11 of 19 passes for 132 yards, but was sacked three times and fumbled once as the Rams were held to only 56 total offensive yards in the second half. The team's 11th defeat of the season surpassed the 1999 Denver Broncos for the most losses suffered by a defending Super Bowl champion.

Week 18: at Seattle Seahawks

A Baker Mayfield interception in overtime led to a game-winning field goal by Seattle kicker Jason Myers as the host Seahawks earned a season sweep of the Rams for the first time since the 2013 season. The loss dropped the Rams' final record to 5–12, the fewest wins and the most losses for a defending Super Bowl champion in a full regular season, and their .294 win percentage eclipsed the .333 mark set by the San Francisco 49ers, who finished 3–6 in the strike-shortened 1982 season. Cornerback Jalen Ramsey had two interceptions of Seahawks quarterback Geno Smith, the first coming on the game's opening offensive play which led to a 22-yard field goal by kicker Matt Gay, who added a second field goal from 45 yards out in the second quarter. The Rams seized a 13–6 halftime with an 11-yard touchdown run on an end around by wide receiver Tutu Atwell to cap off a 9-play, 87-yard drive. Gay added a 38-yard field goal in the third quarter to give the Rams a 16–13 lead. Running back Cam Akers had 21 carries for 104 yards, his third straight game over 100 rushing yards, to lead the Rams offense, while wide receiver Van Jefferson had a team-high three receptions for 61 yards and was the intended receiver on Mayfield's final pass attempt, which was intercepted by Seattle strong safety Quandre Diggs to set up Myers' fourth and decisive field goal. Defensively, Ramsey had five tackles to go along with his two picks while former Seattle linebacker Bobby Wagner had a team-high seven tackles in the Rams' loss.

Standings

Division

Conference

References

External links
 

Los Angeles Rams
Los Angeles Rams seasons
Los Angeles Rams
Rams